Achala Jagodage (born ) is a Sri Lankan politician and a member of the Parliament of Sri Lanka.

References
Parliament profile

Living people
Members of the 12th Parliament of Sri Lanka
Members of the 13th Parliament of Sri Lanka
Members of the 14th Parliament of Sri Lanka
Jathika Nidahas Peramuna politicians
Janatha Vimukthi Peramuna politicians
1973 births